Zoller is a surname. Notable people with the surname include:

Attila Zoller (1927–1998), the first guitarist to discover free jazz, innovator of modern jazz guitar
Gunter Zoller (born 1948), German figure skater and figure skating coach
Hans Zoller (born 1922), Swiss bobsledder who competed in the 1950s and 1960s
Hugo Zoller (1852–1933), German explorer and journalist
Israel (Eugenio) Zolli (1881–1956), born Israel Anton Zoller, Chief Rabbi of Rome, 1939–1945, and post-World War II convert to Catholicism
Karl Zoller (born 1963), American golfer
Karlheinz Zoller (1928–2005), German flautist, principal in the Berlin Philharmonic Orchestra
Martha Zoller (born 1959), columnist, author, and radio personality on the new News-Talk 103
Peter Zoller (born 1952), theoretical physicist from Austria
Raviv Zoller, Israeli businessman
Robert Zoller (born 1961), retired Austrian alpine skier
Stefan Zoller (born 1914), Romanian field handball player of German origin who competed in the 1936 Summer Olympics

See also
Zoller Glacier, glacier flowing north into the Ferrar Glacier of Victoria Land
Zoller-Frasier Round Barn, historic round barn located at Newville in Herkimer County, New York
Zaller
Zeller (disambiguation)
Ziller
Zöller or Zoeller (disambiguation)
Zoller supercharger created by Arnold Zoller